Landes-Hypothekenbank Steiermark A.G. known as HYPO Steiermark is an Austrian bank based in Graz, Styria. The bank was specialized in mortgage. Nowadays it provides private banking.

In 2015 the bank sold the minority stake in Raiffeisen Zentralbank.

The bank was owned by Styria. Nowadays Raiffeisen-Landesbank Steiermark owned 75% stake minus 1 share.

References

External links

  
 

Banks of Austria
Banks established in 1931
Companies based in Graz
Austrian companies established in 1931